15 Years: A Retrospective is the tenth Sons of the San Joaquin album.  It contains three previously unreleased songs.  According to the liner notes, the previously released material was "digitally re-mixed and re-mastered."

Track listing

Personnel

Sons of the San Joaquin

Jack Hannah – vocals, rhythm guitar, percussion
Joe Hannah – vocals, bass fiddle, percussion
Lon Hannah – vocals, lead guitar, rhythm guitar, percussion

Additional personnel

Robert Wagoner – guitar
Richard Chon – fiddle
"Doc" Denning – lead guitar, rhythm guitar
Dennis Mack – bass, rhythm guitar, accordion
Jeff Hall – percussion, tambourine, lead guitar
Mike Dana – guitar
John Lauffenberger – bass
Rich O'Brien – lead guitar, rhythm guitar
Bob Embry – clarinet
Ray Appleton – tambourine, accordion
Mark Abbott – bass
Randy Elmore – fiddle
Dale Morris – fiddle
Hereford Percy – banjo
Tim Alexander – accordion
Eddie Gordon – harmonica

Production

Sons of the San Joaquin – executive producers
Jeff Hall – producer (except where noted)
Russ Pate – producer (except where noted)
Recorded at:
Maximus Recording Studios, Fresno, CA
Jeff Hall – engineer
Nye Morton – engineer
Eric Scherbon – engineer
Eagle Audio, Ft. Worth, TX ("I Ride Along and Dream")
Rich O'Brien – producer
Mark Talmadge – engineer
Warehouse Theater, Colorado Springs CO ("Charlie and the Boys", "Texas Plains")
Rich O'Brien – producer
Scott O'Malley – producer
Butch Hause – engineer
Mark Petty – engineer
Mastered at:
Capitol Mastering, Los Angeles, CA
Robert Vosgien – mastering
Pete Papageorges – mastering
Analog to digital transfers at:
Maximus Media, Fresno, CA
Eric Sherbon – digital transfers
David Martin Graham – photography

External links
Official site

Sons of the San Joaquin compilation albums
2002 compilation albums